Giovanni Battista Capilupi (27 December, 1643 – 3 May, 1716) was a Roman Catholic prelate who served as Bishop of Polignano (1694–1716).

Biography
Giovanni Battista Capilupi was born in Matera, Italy on 27 December 1653.
He was and ordained deacon on 21 March 1676 and ordained a priest on 5 March 1678.
On 13 September 1694, he was appointed during the papacy of Pope Innocent XII as Bishop of Polignano.
On 19 September 1694, he was consecrated bishop by Bandino Panciatici, Cardinal-Priest of San Pancrazio, with Stefano Giuseppe Menatti, Bishop of Como, and Pierre Lambert Ledrou, Titular Bishop of Porphyreon, serving as co-consecrators. 
He served as Bishop of Polignano until his death on 3 May 1716. 

While bishop, he was the principal co-consecrator of Giovanni Dominico Tomati, Titular Bishop of Cyrene (1700).

References 

17th-century Italian Roman Catholic bishops
18th-century Italian Roman Catholic bishops
Bishops appointed by Pope Innocent XII
1653 births
1716 deaths